Łukasz Andrzej Kamiński (born 3 June 1973) is a Polish historian, specializing in the history of Poland after 1945, particularly the period of Soviet occupation and the Polish People's Republic. He is the President of the European Union's Platform of European Memory and Conscience and formerly served as President of the Institute of National Remembrance (IPN) from 2011 to 2016.

Kamiński earned his doctorate in 1999, and became deputy director of the IPN Bureau of Public Education in 2006, becoming director of the Bureau of Public Education in 2009. After his predecessor Janusz Kurtyka died in the 2010 Polish Air Force Tu-154 crash, Kamiński was elected by the Sejm as the third President of the IPN (Franciszek Gryciuk was acting president 2010–2011).

He is a founding signatory of the Prague Declaration on European Conscience and Communism.

Recognitions
Order of Polonia Restituta

Publications 
 Młodzież w oporze społecznym 1945–1989, Wrocław 1996, 
 Strajki robotnicze w Polsce w latach 1945–1948, Wrocław 1999, 
 Młodzież w oporze społecznym 1944–1989, IPN, Warsaw 2002, 
 Biuletyny dzienne Ministerstwa Bezpieczeństwa Publicznego 1949–1950, IPN, Warszawa 2004, 
 Polacy wobec nowej rzeczywistości 1944–1948. Formy pozainstytucjonalnego, żywiołowego oporu społecznego, 2004, 
 Wokół praskiej wiosny. Polska i Czechosłowacja w 1968 roku, IPN, Warsaw 2004, 
 Opór społeczny w Europie Środkowej w latach 1948–1953 na przykładzie Polski, NRD i Czechosłowacji (co-author), Wrocław 2004, 
 A handbook of the communist security apparatus in East Central Europe 1944–1989 (ed.), Institute of National Remembrance, Warsaw, 2005, 
 Wokół pogromu kieleckiego (ed.), IPN, Warsaw 2006, 
 Drogi do wolności Zagłębia Miedziowego (ed.), Legnica 2007,

Footnotes

External links 

21st-century Polish historians
Polish male non-fiction writers
1973 births
Living people
Recipients of the Order of Polonia Restituta
University of Wrocław alumni
Academic staff of the University of Wrocław
People associated with the Institute of National Remembrance